General Cassidy may refer to:

Duane H. Cassidy (1933–2016), U.S. Air Force general
Patrick F. Cassidy (1915–1990), U.S. Army lieutenant general
William F. Cassidy (1908–2002), U.S. Army lieutenant general

See also
Attorney General Cassidy (disambiguation)